This is a list of Roman consuls designate, individuals who were either elected or nominated to the highest elected political office of the Roman Republic, or a high office of the Empire, but who for some reason did not enter office at the beginning of the year, either through death, disgrace, or due to changes in imperial administration.

6th–2nd centuries BC

1st century BC

1st century AD

2nd and 3rd centuries AD

4th and 5th centuries AD

References

Bibliography
 Dictionary of Greek and Roman Biography and Mythology, William Smith, ed., Little, Brown and Company, Boston (1849).
 Paul von Rohden, Elimar Klebs, & Hermann Dessau, Prosopographia Imperii Romani (The Prosopography of the Roman Empire, abbreviated PIR), Berlin (1898).
 Ronald Syme, The Roman Revolution, Oxford University Press (1939); "Governors Dying in Syria" in Zeitschrift für Papyrologie und Epigraphik, pp. 125–144 (1981).
 T. Robert S. Broughton, The Magistrates of the Roman Republic, vol. II (1952); vol. III (1986).
 Michael Swan, "The Consular Fasti of 23 BC and the Conspiracy of Varro Murena", Harvard Studies in Classical Philology, vol. 71, pp. 235 – 247 (1967).
 A. H. M. Jones & J. R. Martindale, The Prosopography of the Later Roman Empire, vol. I (1971).
 Alan Cameron, Barbarians and Politics at the Court of Arcadius, University of California Press (1993).
 Brian W. Jones, The Emperor Domitian, Taylor & Francis (1993).
 Vasily Rudich, Political Dissidence under Nero: the Price of Dissimulation, Routledge (1993).
 D. Wardle, "Suetonius' Life of Caligula: a Commentary", Revue d'Etudes Latines, vol. 225 (1994).
 Francis X. Ryan, Rank and Participation in the Republican Senate, Franz Steiner Verlag (1998).
 Miriam T. Griffin, Nero: The End of a Dynasty, Psychology Press (2000).
 Linda Jones Hall, Roman Berytus: Beirut in late antiquity, Routledge (2004).
 Barbara Levick, 66 Claudius, Yale University Press (1993); Vespasian, Routledge (1999).

Roman consuls
 
Consuls